The 1957 Dartmouth Indians football team represented Dartmouth College during the 1957 NCAA University Division football season.

Schedule

References

Dartmouth
Dartmouth Big Green football seasons
Dartmouth Indians football